John Fenton-Cawthorne  (5 January 1753 – 1 March 1831) was a British Conservative politician, who served as MP for Lincoln between 1783 and 1796 and as MP for Lancaster for four terms in the early 19th century.

Fenton-Cawthorne was born in 1753 to Elizabeth née Cawthorne and James Fenton of Lancaster, a barrister, and educated at Queen's College, Oxford (1771) and Gray's Inn (1792). He succeeded to the Cawthorne estate in 1781 and took the additional surname of Cawthorne.

He was first elected as an MP for Lincoln in January 1783 and was an opponent of the abolition of the slave trade.

On 27November 1795, as Colonel of the Westminster Regiment of Middlesex Militia, Fenton-Cawthorne was arraigned before a court-martial on 14 charges including that of embezzling "marching guineas" paid to  militiamen of the British Army. Found guilty on seven of the charges, he was cashiered as "unworthy of serving His Majesty in any military capacity whatever" having "acted fraudulently and in a scandalous and infamous manner".

Fenton-Cawthorne returned to Parliament in 1806 as MP for Lancaster. His older brother also entered Parliament at the same time as MP for Fife.

He married Frances Delaval (1759–1838), the daughter and coheiress of John Delaval, 1st Baron Delaval.

Fenton-Cawthorne died on 1March 1831 in Hanover Street, Hanover Square, London.

References

1753 births
Alumni of The Queen's College, Oxford
Members of Gray's Inn
Conservative Party (UK) MPs for English constituencies
British politicians convicted of corruption
Members of the Parliament of Great Britain for English constituencies
British MPs 1780–1784
British MPs 1784–1790
UK MPs 1806–1807
UK MPs 1812–1818
UK MPs 1820–1826
UK MPs 1826–1830
UK MPs 1830–1831
Middlesex Militia officers
Politicians convicted of embezzlement
Expelled members of the Parliament of Great Britain
1831 deaths